Haplostethini is a tribe of metallic wood-boring beetles in the family Buprestidae. There are at least 3 genera and more than 60 described species in Haplostethini.

Genera
These genera belong to the tribe Haplostethini:
 Ankareus Kerremans, 1894
 Exaesthetus Waterhouse, 1889
 Helferella Cobos, 1957
 Mastogenius Solier, 1849
 Micrasta Kerremans, 1893
 Namibogenius Bellamy, 1996
 Neomastogenius Toyama, 1983
 Pseudotrigonogya Manley, 1986
 Siamastogenius Toyama, 1983
 Trigonogya Schaeffer, 1919

References

Further reading

 
 
 
 
 

Buprestidae
Articles created by Qbugbot